Bankim Chandra Ray (born 1 November 1926) is an Indian former judge of the Supreme Court of India and politician.

Early life 
Ray was born to Bhuson Chandra Ray into a rich Namasudra zamindar family at 24 Praganas, Bengal Presidency, British India (now West Bengal, India). He did his schooling from Multi Peary Srimantha Institution at Magrahat, in 1946 he completed his B.A from Ripon College (now Surendranath College), in 1951 completed his LL.B in from University Law College (now Department of Law, University of Calcutta) and M.A (Political Economy) from University of Calcutta.

Career 
In 1952 he got enrolled as a lawyer at Calcutta High Court and started his private practice. He got posted as Additional Judge of Calcutta High Court in June, 1976 and elevated to permanent  judge in December, 1976.

Ray was nominated as judge at Supreme Court of India in 1985 and became second Dalit judge to hold such position after A. Vardarajan. He was associated with Indian National Congress since his college days and in 1957 West Bengal legislative assembly election he fought from Baruipur constituency but lost to Gangadhar Naskar of CPI.

References 

1926 births
Possibly living people
Indian judges
University of Calcutta alumni
Judges of the Calcutta High Court
Justices of the Supreme Court of India
Indian politicians